Simsky (Eśem) is a rural locality (a village) in Sakhayevsky Selsoviet, Karmaskalinsky District, Bashkortostan, Russia. The population was 42 as of 2010. There are 3 streets.

Geography 
Simsky is located 31 km northeast of Karmaskaly (the district's administrative centre) by road. Kuyashkino is the nearest rural locality.

References 

Rural localities in Karmaskalinsky District